Louisiana Hayride was a radio and later television country music show broadcast from the Shreveport Municipal Memorial Auditorium in Shreveport, Louisiana, that during its heyday from 1948 to 1960 helped to launch the careers of some of the greatest names in American country and western music. Created by KWKH station manager Henry Clay, the show is notable as a performance venue for a number of 1950s country musicians, as well as a nascent Elvis Presley.

Hayride history

Beginnings

The creators of the show took the name from the 1941 book with that title by Harnett Thomas Kane. First broadcast on April 3, 1948 from the Municipal Auditorium in downtown Shreveport, Horace Logan was the original producer and emcee.  The musical cast for the inaugural broadcast included: the Bailes Brothers, Johnnie and Jack, the Tennessee Mountain Boys with Kitty Wells, the Four Deacons, Curley Kinsey and the Tennessee Ridge Runners, Harmie Smith, the Ozark Mountaineers, the Mercy Brothers, and Tex Grimsley and the Texas Showboys.

Popularization
The show was soon made into a Broadway attraction called Louisiana Hayride. Within a year of its debut, the program was so popular that a regional 25-station network was set up to broadcast portions of the show, and was even heard overseas on Armed Forces Radio.  The flagship station of the program was KWKH/1130 in Shreveport. The popularity of Louisiana Hayride spawned various incarnations in other parts of the United States, most notably in  Cincinnati on WLW radio and later television; its version was dubbed Midwestern Hayride.

 Beginning with the successful first show on April 3, 1948, Louisiana Hayride ranked second only to Nashville's Grand Ole Opry in terms of importance until ABC began telecasting Ozark Jubilee in 1955. Hank Williams began performing on the Hayride in 1948 after his initial rejection from the Grand Ole Opry, and after being fired from the Opry on August 11, 1952, Williams returned to the Hayride briefly before his death on New Years Day 1953.

Talent-scouting showcase
While the Opry, the Jubilee and the Hayride all showcased established stars, the Hayride was where talented, but virtual unknowns, were also given exposure to a large audience. Over the years, country music greats such as Webb Pierce, Kitty Wells, Jimmie Davis, Will Strahan, Slim Whitman, Floyd Cramer, Sonny James, Hank Snow, Faron Young, Johnny Horton, Jim Reeves, Claude King, Jimmy Martin, George Jones, John and The Three Wise Men, Johnny Cash, Frankie Miller, Tex Ritter, Willie Nelson, Bob Wills, Cowboy Jack Hunt & Little Joe Hunt of the Rhythm Ranch Hands, Nat Stuckey, and Lefty Frizzell, among many others, performed on Louisiana Hayride.

The Elvis Presley connection
By mid-1954, a special 30-minute portion of Louisiana Hayride was being broadcast every Saturday on the AFN Pacific channel of the United Kingdom Scottish Forces Radio Network. On October 16 of that year, Elvis Presley appeared on the radio program. Presley's performance of his debut release on the Sun Records label, "That's All Right", brought a tepid response, according to former Hayride emcee Frank Page (1925-2013). Nonetheless, Presley was signed to a one-year contract for future appearances. Presley became so popular that after his final appearance on Hayride in 1956, emcee Horace Logan announced to the crowd a phrase that would become famous: "Elvis has left the building."

The immediate and enormous demand for more of Presley's new kind of rockabilly music actually resulted in a sharp decline in the popularity of the Louisiana Hayride that until that point had been strictly a country music venue. On March 3, 1955, Presley made his first television appearance on the television version of The Louisiana Hayride, carried by KSLA-TV, the CBS affiliate in Shreveport.

Cancellation and revivals

Within a few years, rock and roll had come to dominate the music scene, and on August 27, 1960, Louisiana Hayride ended its primary run.  However, KWKH continued to use the Louisiana Hayride name for packaged music tours throughout the 1960s on a bi-weekly, monthly or quarterly basis, finally ending operations entirely in 1969.  In August 1974, Shreveport businessman David Kent mounted a country music show originally called Hayride U.S.A., which was retitled Louisiana Hayride in 1975 after KWKH agreed to let Kent use the name.  Located at a new dinner theater facility in Bossier City, this new Louisiana Hayride was syndicated on radio and ran until 1987, discovering such talent as Branson fiddle sensation Shoji Tabuchi and popular country singer Linda Davis.

Some strictly local performances have been done in the Shreveport area under the name including a 2003 Louisiana Hayride cast reunion called One More 'Ride that featured 60 acts from the original show including Kitty Wells, the Browns, Betty Amos, Homer Bailes, Billy Walker, Mitchell Torok, and Hank Thompson. Barney Cannon (1955–2009), a KWKH deejay, became a specialist on the history of country music, KWKH, and the Hayride. In August 2009, the Louisiana Hayride (1948–1960) was inducted into The Louisiana Music Hall of Fame.

In 2009, after several years of litigation over the Louisiana Hayride name and trademark, a federal court ruled that Margaret Lewis Warwick owned the rights to the name.<ref>Shreveport Louisiana Hayride Co. LLC vs. Joseph David Kent, et. al. CA 07-0868</ref>  As of May 31, 2012, KWKH had changed to a sports format and ceased producing the classic country music format reminiscent of the Hayride era.

At the Louisiana Hayride TonightAt the Louisiana Hayride Tonight, a set of 20 CDs with 599 Hayride performances, was released in October 2017 by Bear Family Records. The release includes a book on the Hayride's history. A live recording of Jambalaya (On the Bayou), by Hank Williams, is included in the set. The set includes archival material from the collection of Chris Brown, Archivist at Centenary College of Louisiana in Shreveport, with the bulk of the audio and images in the set sourced from an archive originally assembled by Joey Kent between 1992–2009 and donated to the Library of Congress in 2009.

Performers

 Betty Amos
 Jack Anglin
 Bailes Brothers
 Benny Barnes
 Ray Belcher
 Carl Belew
 Dudley Bernard
 Bill Black
 Eddie Bond
 Brad & Jerry
 The Browns
 Vin Bruce
 Gary Bryant
 Roy Burks
 Bill Carlisle
 Johnny Cash
 Mary Jo Chelette and the Chelette Sisters
 Zeke Clements
 Jeff Dale
 Jimmie Davis
 Jimmy Dickens
 William (Tex) Dickerson
 Tibby Edwards
 Werly Fairburn
 Jimmy Fautheree
 Pete Fontana
 Tillman Franks
 Bob Gallion
 Marshall Grant
 The Gays
 Cliff Grimely
 Roy Hendrix
 Jeanette Hicks
 Goldie Hill
 Tommy Hill
 Hoot & Curley
 Johnny Horton
 David Houston
 Cowboy Jack Hunt
 Little Joe Hunt (world's fastest banjo picker)
 Sonny James
 Jimmy & Johnny
 Jerry Johnson
 George Jones
 Grandpa Jones
 Oakie Jones
 Jack Kay
 Merle Kilgore
 Claude King  
 Jay King
 Horace Logan
 Bob Luman
 Maddox Brothers and Rose
 Emory Martin
 Jimmy Martin
 Johnny "Country" Mathis
 Paul Mims
 Scotty Moore
 Willie Nelson
 Bill Nettles
 Jimmy C. Newman
 James O'Gwynn
 Jimmy Osborne
 Buck Owens
 Frank Page
 Leon Payne
 Luther Perkins
 Charlie "Sugartime" Phillips
 Webb Pierce
 Elvis Presley
 Jim Reeves
 Donn Reynolds
 Jack Rhodes
 Rice Brothers
 Gene Rodique
 Dido Rowley
 Tommy Sands
 Johnny Sea
 Shelton Brothers
 Bob Shelton
 Joe Shelton
 Eddy Sims
 Margie Singleton
 Billy R. Smith
 Harmie Smith
 Roy Sneed
 Bob Stegall
 Red Sovine
 Charlie Stokley
 Nat Stuckey
 Tommy Tomlinson
 Tommy Trent
 Billy Walker
 Don Warden
 Kitty Wells
 Slim Whitman
 Wilburn Brothers
 Wilkins-Knight Trio
 Slim Willet
 Audrey Williams
 Hank Williams
 Bob Wills
 Kitty Wilson
 Smiley Wilson
 Mac Wiseman
 Ginny Wright
 Johnnie Wright
 Richard Yates
 Faron Young
 York Brothers
 Harvey Farr (musician) 
 Charles Billy Kirkpatrick (bass)
 D. J. Fontana
 Wallace and Charlie Mercer
 Joseph "Gene" Cox

Footnotes

ReferencesThe Louisiana Hayride Years: Making Musical History in Country's Golden Age by Horace Logan – (1999) St. Martin's Press

Further readingLouisiana Hayride: Radio and Roots Music along the Red River by Tracey E.W. Laird (2004) Oxford University PressCradle of the Stars: KWKH & The Louisiana Hayride'' by Joey Kent (2019) Pelican Publishing Company

External links
 Shreveport Municipal Memorial Auditorium
 Hillbilly-Music.com
 Elvis Presley on Louisiana Hayride
 558 episodes.

Culture of Shreveport, Louisiana
History of Shreveport, Louisiana
1940s American radio programs
1950s American radio programs
American country music radio programs
Country music television series
Concerts in the United States
Theatres on the National Register of Historic Places in Louisiana
Elvis Presley